Landquart may refer to:
Landquart (river), a river in Graubünden, Switzerland
Landquart (district), a district in Graubünden, Switzerland
Landquart, Graubünden, a municipality in Switzerland
Landquart railway station

See also
Landquart Ried railway station